Rineloricaria castroi is a species of catfish in the family Loricariidae. It is native to South America, where it occurs in the Trombetas River basin in Brazil. The species reaches 16 cm (6.3 inches) in standard length and is believed to be a facultative air-breather.

References 

Fish described in 1984
Catfish of South America
Fish of Brazil
Loricariidae